Huon Gulf is a large gulf in eastern Papua New Guinea. It is bordered by Huon Peninsula in the north. Both are named after French explorer Jean-Michel Huon de Kermadec. Huon Gulf is a part of the Solomon Sea. Its northern boundary is marked by Cape Cretin, southern by Cape Longerue. Lae, capital of the Morobe Province, is located on the northern coast of the gulf.

Markham Bay forms the north-western corner of Huon Gulf, where the Markham River ends.

Bodies of water of Papua New Guinea
Gulfs of the Pacific Ocean
Morobe Province